The 2014 VLN Series was the 37th season of the VLN.

Calendar

Race Results
Results indicate overall winners only.

Footnotes

References

External links 
 
 

2014 in German motorsport
Nürburgring Endurance Series seasons